The Detection of Intrusions and Malware, and Vulnerability Assessment (DIMVA) event is an annual conference designed to serve as a general forum for discussing malware and the vulnerability of computing systems to attacks, advancing computer security through the exchange of ideas. It is one of the projects of the German Informatics Society (GI).

According to the official DIMVA website on its 2017 event, "Each year, DIMVA brings together international experts from academia, industry, and government to present and discuss novel research in these areas." Said conference was held from 6 July to 7 July in the city of Bonn, Germany. It was sponsored by entities such as Google, Rohde & Schwarz, and VMRay.

A conference report that demonstrated how to externally manipulate an Alfa Romeo Giulietta's networked safety systems and essentially hack into the vehicle attracted notice from publications such as Fiat Chrysler Authority.

See also 
 German Informatics Society
 Malware
 Malware analysis
 Vulnerability (computing)
 Security engineering

References 

Computer security organizations